Mariam Kayode  is a Nigerian actress who came into limelight with the film Children of Mud. She has featured in movies including The Coffin Salesman, City of Bastards, and Bayi among others.

Early life and education
She was born in Oyo State on 1 June 2007. Mariam was schooled at Kingsfield College, Ijede campus.

Career
The young actress started acting right from tender age and the films Children of Mud and The Coffin Salesman made her popular.

Filmography
Bayi

Dark Light (2015)

Children of the Mud (2017)

Dark Light (2015)

Price of admission (2020)

Don’t Leave Me (2016)

City of Bastards (2019)

The Coffin Salesman (2019)

Happiness Ltd (2016)

Black Dove (2021)

Awards and nominations
Best actress in the short play Children of Mud at AMVCA 2018 awards.

Best child actress for the film The Coffin Salesman for BON award, 2018.

See also
 Children of mud
 Stan Nze

References

2007 births
Living people
Nigerian film actresses
Yoruba actresses
21st-century Nigerian actresses
Actresses in Yoruba cinema